Egil Sophus Severen Holmsen (February 15, 1917 – May 30, 1990) was a Swedish film director, screenwriter, journalist, author and actor. He was the younger brother of author Sverre Holmsen.

Career 

Holmsen initially worked as a journalist until he transitioned into the film industry as an actor. He debuted in Alf Sjöberg's Home from Babylon in 1941. He continued to work as an actor during the 1940s, until he began to direct and write scrips for various major production companies. In 1947, he debuted as a director with The Battle for the Coffee and as a screenwriter with City in the South. Holmsen followed with three coming-of-age films in the 1950s, Dangerous Curve in 1952, followed by Marianne and Speedfever in 1953. All three films depicted young teenagers in the criminal underworld of Stockholm.

Holmsen was heavily criticized after the release of Marianne, as it explored themes considered taboo at the time such as teenage sex, drugs and lesbian love. His next film Speedfever was also panned as it depicted crime and gay prostitution, which also caused it to be heavily censored. Holmsen's spree of controversial films did not end, as his following film, The Horse Handler's Girls, contained a provocative end scene featuring incest. It was his last feature film as a director.

During the 1950s to the 1970s, Holmsen continued writing scripts, particularly for several housewife films. Holmsen then revived his acting career in 1972 starring in the adult film Swedish Wildcats. He later starred in Champagne Gallop (1975), The Brothers Lionheart (1977), Dante - watch out for the Shark! (1978) and the TV show Stakeout (1983), which became his last role.

Holmsen began to write novels in the 1980s. His bibliography comprises Explosives (1981), Inheritance (1982) and In Goddesses Womb (1985).

Filmography

As an actor

As a director

As a screenwriter

References

External links
 

Swedish film directors
1917 births
1990 deaths